Ahmetia achaja is a butterfly species in the family Lycaenidae. It belongs to the monotypic genus Ahmetia, formerly known as Cowania (which actually refers to a tachina fly genus). It is sometimes assigned to the tribe Horagini, but it is more probably a member of the closely related Cheritrini.It is found in Thailand and Vietnam.

Cheritrini
Lycaenidae genera
Monotypic butterfly genera